Chromosome 8 is one of the 23 pairs of chromosomes in humans. People normally have two copies of this chromosome. Chromosome 8 spans about 146 million base pairs (the building material of DNA) and represents between 4.5 and 5.0% of the total DNA in cells.

About 8% of its genes are involved in brain development and function, and about 16% are involved in cancer. A unique feature of 8p is a region of about 15 megabases that appears to have a high mutation rate. This region shows a significant divergence between human and chimpanzee, suggesting that its high mutation rates have contributed to the evolution of the human brain.



Genes

Number of genes 
The following are some of the gene count estimates of human chromosome 8. Because researchers use different approaches to genome annotation their predictions of the number of genes on each chromosome varies (for technical details, see gene prediction). Among various projects, the collaborative consensus coding sequence project (CCDS) takes an extremely conservative strategy. So CCDS's gene number prediction represents a lower bound on the total number of human protein-coding genes.

Gene list 

The following is a partial list of genes on human chromosome 8. For complete list, see the link in the infobox on the right.

Diseases and disorders
The following diseases and disorders are some of those related to genes on chromosome 8:

 8p23.1 duplication syndrome
 Burkitt lymphoma
 Charcot–Marie–Tooth disease
 COACH syndrome
 Cleft lip and cleft palate
 Cohen syndrome
 Congenital hypothyroidism
 Fahr's syndrome
 Hereditary multiple exostoses
 Lipoprotein lipase deficiency, familial
 Myelodysplastic syndrome
 Pfeiffer syndrome
 Primary microcephaly
 Rothmund–Thomson syndrome
 Schizophrenia, associated with 8p21-22 locus
 Waardenburg syndrome
 Werner syndrome
 Pingelapese blindness
 Langer–Giedion syndrome
 Roberts syndrome
 Hepatocellular carcinoma
 Sanfilippo syndrome

Cytogenetic band

References

External links

 
 

Chromosomes (human)